Hertl is a surname. Notable people with the surname include:

Björn Hertl (born 1976), German footballer
Jan Hertl (1929–1996), Czech footballer
Jaroslav Hertl (born 1989), Czech ice hockey player
Tomáš Hertl (born 1993), Czech ice hockey player

Unisex given names
Masculine given names
Surnames from given names